Birgit Cold (born 1936) was a Danish-born Norwegian architect and educator. She established her own practice in Trondheim together with Tore Brantenberg and Edvard Hiorthøy in 1964 and became a professor at the Norwegian University of Science and Technology in 1985. Her main areas of interest include the school environment and concern for well-being and health. Cold is also known for her sketching which she often uses to express her understanding of architecture.

Biography
Born in Copenhagen on 8 April 1936, Cold studied architecture at Royal Danish Academy of Fine Arts, graduating in 1961. She then spent a period working with the Danish architect and designer Verner Panton. 
In 1964, she moved to Norway. 
There, together with her husband Tore Brantenberg and the Norwegian architect Edvard Hiorthøy, she established the architectural firm Brantenberg, Cold and Hiorthøy in Trondheim and ran it until 2000. The firm is known above all for collective housing developments in new residential areas, earning first prize for designing the housing cooperative in Trondheim Risvollan in 1967.

From 1980 to 2010, she was professor of the Department of Architectural Design and Management at Norwegian University of Science and Technology. She became a member of the university's research team which developed the Skiboli prototype, an experimental attempt at producing energy-saving low-cost housing with high flexibility. A modified version on the university campus is still in use today.

Cold is also known for her sketches, often created with her own architecture project. She also used her sketches as an aid to teaching. In 2008, many were published in her book Skissen som santale (The Sketch for Discussion), published by Tapir Akademisk Forlag.

Recognition
Cold is a member of the Norwegian Academy of Technological Sciences.

Family
Birgit Cold is the daughter of Sigurd Cold and Kirsten Alma Agga. In 1961, she married the architect Tore Brantenberg. The couple have two children.

Selected publications

References

1936 births
Living people
Danish women architects
Norwegian women architects
Academic staff of the Norwegian University of Science and Technology
Architects from Copenhagen
Architects from Trondheim
Danish emigrants to Norway
Royal Danish Academy of Fine Arts alumni
Members of the Norwegian Academy of Technological Sciences